Imperial commissioner is an ambivalent English language term, used to render foreign language titles of various – mostly gubernatorial – officers whose 'commission' was in the gift of an Emperor, including China, the Russian Empire and the Holy Roman Empire.
 
The German title, in both the German Empire (1871-1918) and Nazi Germany (1933-45), was usually Reichskommissar.
However, Imperial Commissioner can also be used to render Kaiserlicher Kommissar, which in German etymology refers to the Emperor, not to the Empire. This was notably the case for a gubernatorial style in the colonial possession of Jaluit (in the South sea, presently in the Marshall Islands), which were administered, after a single Kommissar ('Commissioner'; 1885 - 1886,  Gustav von Oertzen,  b. 18.. - d. 1911), by the following Kaiserliche Kommissare :
1886 - 5 October 1887  Wilhelm Knappe  (b. 1855 - d. 1910) 
5 October 1887 - 29 March 1889  Franz Leopold Sonnenschein  (acting to 14 April 1888)   (b. 1857 - d. 1897) 
29 March 1889 - 14 April 1890  Eugen Brandeis (acting) (b. 1846 - d. 1919)  (1st time) 
14 April 1890 - February 1892  Friedrich Louis Max Biermann   (b. 1856 - d. 1929) 
Feb 1892 - 1893  Eugen Brandeis (acting)  (2nd time) 
1893 - 1894     Ernst Schmidt-Dargitz    (b. 1859 - d. 1924); thereafter by Landeshauptleute

See also
Imperial Commissioner (China)
Commissioner

Sources and references
 WorldStatesmen- Marshall islands

External links
 Imperial Commissioner

Gubernatorial titles